is the second train station on the Sagano Scenic Line, a sightseeing train that follows the picturesque Hozukyo Ravine of the old JR West Sagano Line. It is located in Kamigyo-ku, Kyoto, Japan.

Station layout 

Owing to the large number of stairs between the station and the platform, it is not wheelchair accessible.

Adjacent stations

References

External links 
 
 
 

Stations of Sagano Scenic Railway
Railway stations in Japan opened in 1991